Cameron Brown may refer to:

People
Cam Brown (ice hockey) (born 1969), Canadian ice hockey player
Cam Brown (American football) (born 1998), American football linebacker
Cameron Brown (musician) (born 1945), American jazz musician
Cameron Brown (triathlete), New Zealand triathlete
Cameron Brown (game director), American video game director
Cameron S. Brown (born 1954), politician from the U.S. state of Michigan

Other uses
Cameron-Brown, a mortgage banking firm which became First Union Mortgage in 1987

Brown, Cameron